Vâlcea County (also spelt Vîlcea) is a county (județ) of Romania. Located in the historical regions of Oltenia and Muntenia (which are separated by the Olt River), it is also part of the wider Wallachia region. Its capital city is Râmnicu Vâlcea.

Demographics 

In 2011, it had a population of 355,320 and the population density was 61.63/km2.

 Romanians - over 98%
 Roma, others -  2%

Geography

They are separated by the Olt River valley - the most accessible passage between Transylvania and Muntenia.

Towards the South, the heights decrease, passing through the sub-carpathian hills to a high plain in the West side of the Romanian Plain.

The main river is the Olt River crossing the county from North to South. Its main affluents are the Lotru River in the North and the Olteț River in the South.

Neighbours

Argeș County in the East.
Gorj County and Hunedoara County in the West.
Sibiu County and Alba County in the North.
Dolj County and Olt County in the South.

Economy

The predominant industries in the county are:
 Chemical industry.
 Food and beverage industry.
 Textile industry.
 Mechanical components industry.
 Construction materials.
 Wood and furniture industry.

In the West of the county coal and salt are extracted.

The area in the center of the county is well suited for fruit orchards, wines and raising cattle. The South is better suited for growing cereals and vegetables.

Tourism
The main tourist destinations are:
 The Olt River Valley:
 The Călimănești-Căciulata resorts
 The Cozia Monastery.
 The Turnu Monastery.
 The Cozia Mountains.
 Various small churches and fortifications.
 The Lotru River valley:
 The town of Brezoi.
 The Lotru Mountains.
 The Voineasa Resort
 The Vidra Resort
 The Obârșia Lotrului Resort.
 The city of Râmnicu Vâlcea.
 The Băile Govora Resort.
 The Băile Olănești Resort.

Politics
The Vâlcea County Council, renewed at the 2020 Romanian local elections, consists of 32 counsellors, with the following party composition:

Administrative divisions 

Vâlcea County has two municipalities, nine towns and 78 communes as follows:

 Municipalities
 Râmnicu Vâlcea - county seat town; population: 93,151 (as of 2022)
 Drăgășani

 Towns
 Băbeni
 Băile Govora
 Băile Olănești
 Bălcești
 Berbești
 Brezoi
 Călimănești
 Horezu
 Ocnele Mari

 Communes
 Alunu
 Amărăști
 Bărbătești
 Berislăvești
 Boișoara
 Budești
 Bujoreni
 Bunești
 Câineni
 Cernișoara
 Copăceni
 Costești
 Crețeni
 Dăești
 Dănicei
 Diculești
 Drăgoești
 Fârtățești
 Făurești
 Frâncești
 Galicea
 Ghioroiu
 Glăvile
 Golești
 Grădiștea
 Gușoeni
 Ionești
 Lăcusteni
 Lădești
 Laloșu
 Lăpușata
 Livezi
 Lungești
 Măciuca
 Mădulari
 Malaia
 Măldărești
 Mateești
 Mihăești
 Milcoiu
 Mitrofani
 Muereasca
 Nicolae Bălcescu
 Olanu
 Orlești
 Oteșani
 Păușești
 Păușești-Măglași
 Perișani
 Pesceana
 Pietrari
 Popești
 Prundeni
 Racovița
 Roești
 Roșiile
 Runcu
 Sălătrucel
 Scundu
 Sinești
 Șirineasa
 Slătioara
 Stănești
 Ștefănești
 Stoenești
 Stoilești
 Stroești
 Șușani
 Sutești
 Tetoiu
 Titești
 Tomșani
 Vaideeni
 Valea Mare
 Vlădești
 Voicești
 Voineasa
 Zătreni

Historical county

Historically, the county was located in the southwestern part of Greater Romania, in the northeast part of the historical region of Oltenia. Its capital was Râmnicu Vâlcea. The interwar county territory comprised a large part of the current Vâlcea County; however the territories situated to the east of the Olt River in the current county were not part of the historical county.

The county was bordered to the north by Sibiu County, to the east by the counties of Argeș and Olt, to the south by Romanați County, and to the west by the counties of Dolj and Gorj.

Administration

The county was in 1930 divided into five administrative districts (plăși):
Plasa Cerna, headquartered at Lădești
Plasa Cozia, headquartered at Călimănești
Plasa Drăgășani, headquartered at Drăgășani
Plasa Horezu, headquartered at Horezu
Plasa Zătreni, headquartered at Zătreni

By 1938, there were six districts, four previous and two new ones resulting from the reorganisation of the southwest part of the county:
Plasa Cerna, headquartered at Lădești
Plasa Cozia, headquartered at Călimănești
Plasa Drăgășani, headquartered at Drăgășani
Plasa Horezu, headquartered at Horezu
Plasa Bălcești, headquartered at Bălcești
Plasa Oltețu, headquartered at Oltețu

Population 
According to the 1930 census data, the county population was 246,713 inhabitants, ethnically divided as follows: 97.4% Romanians, 1.6% Romanies, 0.2% Germans, 0.2% Hungarians, 0.2% Jews, as well as other minorities. From the religious point of view, the population was 99.0% Eastern Orthodox, 0.4% Roman Catholic, 0.2% Jewish, as well as other minorities.

Urban population 
In 1930, the county's urban population was 31,909 inhabitants, comprising 94.8% Romanians, 1.3% Romanies, 1.0% Germans, 0.8% Jews, 0.7% Hungarians, as well as other minorities. From the religious point of view, the urban population was composed of 96.4% Eastern Orthodox, 1.4% Roman Catholic, 0.8% Jewish, 0.7% Lutheran, 0.3% Greek Catholic, as well as other minorities.

References

External links

 
Counties of Romania
Geography of Wallachia
1879 establishments in Romania
1938 disestablishments in Romania
1940 establishments in Romania
1950 disestablishments in Romania
1968 establishments in Romania
States and territories established in 1879
States and territories disestablished in 1938
States and territories established in 1940
States and territories disestablished in 1950
States and territories established in 1968